Antonio Fortún (ca. 1800 – ca. 1860) was the first corregidor Mayor of Ponce, Puerto Rico. He was the top civil authority in the municipality of Ponce from April 1850 to 8 January 1851. He was a Spanish military officer with the rank of Coronel.

Mayoral term
As corregidor, he had been named by the Spanish Crown to serve as Alcalde, but had both administrative duties and judicial powers. Fortún was he first corregidor in Ponce. It resulted from the Spanish Crown Order of 13 December 1849, which mandated Puerto Rico Provincial governor Juan de la Pezuela to institute a corregidor in Ponce. This he did via his Announcement dated 19 March 1850. In the following month (April), Antonio Fortún took over. At the time of this assignment, Fortún was the military commander of the district of Ponce.

See also

 List of Puerto Ricans
 List of mayors of Ponce, Puerto Rico
 Corregimiento

Notes

References

Further reading
 Ramon Marin. Las Fiestas Populares de Ponce. Editorial Universidad de Puerto Rico. 1994.

External links
 Guardia Civil española (c. 1898) (Includes military ranks in 1880s Spanish Empire.)

Mayors of Ponce, Puerto Rico
1800s births
1860s deaths
Year of birth uncertain
Year of death uncertain